Gus Solomons Jr. (born 27 April 1940) is an accomplished dancer, choreographer, dance critic, and actor.  He is a leading figure in postmodern and experimental dance.

Dancer
Gus Solomons Jr., born and raised in Cambridge, Massachusetts, began his serious dance training in modern dance and ballet while an undergraduate architecture student at the Massachusetts Institute of Technology (MIT).  He was a member of a local dance company called Dance Makers, and it was there where he began his experimental solo choreography.  A year after graduating from MIT with a Bachelor of Architecture degree, Solomons moved to New York City with a "burning itch to perform and make dances".  In 1962, he worked alongside other dance experimentalists at a studio in New York City.  According to Solomons, quoted in Banes, they wanted to "find new forms, ways of making dances that were different from those of our mentors".  Although he was interested in deconstructing forms and structures, he was also passionate about technical dancing.  He performed with the companies of Pearl Lang, Donald McKayle, Joyce Trisler, Paul Sanasardo, and Martha Graham, although his most significant association during this period was with Merce Cunningham and Company from 1965 to 1968.

Choreographer
In 1972, Solomons founded the Gus Solomons Company/Dance, whose repertoire consisted of detailed and analytical compositions that were conceived as "melted architecture", drawing from his experience as an architecture student at MIT.   He undertook a clinical, postmodern approach to dance making that linked a fascination with puzzles and architectural design to the process of "kinetic autobiography".  During an interview with Open Door, the MIT newspaper, Solomons compared movement design to building design in principle, with the exception that dance was not fixed in time.   Solomons' choreographies, of which there are more than 165, were created to suit the dancers, not vice versa, because he was concerned with how the dancers felt while executing the movement.  
From the outset, Solomons saw the potential of integrating dance and video.  According to Solomons, one of his most exciting projects was the dual-screen video-dance City/Motion/Space/Game produced in 1968 by Rick Hauser at WGBH-TV in Boston.  This double-channel work was a collaborative work of Solomons, writer Mary Feldhaus-Weber, and composer John Morris.  City/Motion/Space/Game, in its half-hour duration, was an "investigation of the unique properties of the video medium that are unlike live performance: reduced scale, flattening of spatial dimensions, and accelerated visual space".

Dance critic
Forty years later, Solomons continues to make a living from dancing, choreographing, experimenting, and critiquing dance.  Since 1980, he has devoted some of his time to dance criticism, and his reviews have appeared in The Village Voice, Ballet News, Attitude, Dance Magazine, and The Chronicle of Higher Education, among others.  A few of his articles include:
"Good guys" The Village Voice 45:43. 31 October 2000.
"Dance:King Rex" The Village Voice 43:20. 19 May 1998.
"Teach-Learn Connection: Technique: Move your Feet! Merce Cunningham Technique" Dance Magazine 81:11. November 2007.
"Merce Among the Children" Dance Magazine 77:4. April 2003.

Collective
Gus Solomons Jr. is currently in a collective known as PARADIGM, which he founded in 1996, whose goal is to "promote and celebrate the talents of mature artists on stage".  Paradigm has toured in numerous parts of the United States, including New York, Massachusetts, Texas, California, among others, and has won audience acclaim.

Collaborators 
Solomons has collaborated with Mio Morales on several works, including:
 Differences of Need, choreography by Gus Solomons Jr.; music and sound collage by Mio Morales
 Melba, presented by the Suitcase Fund of Dance Theater Workshop in association with Pepatian; conceived by Tony Gillotte, Eva Gasteazoro and Yolanda Blanco; choreography by Eva Gasteazoro; directed by Tony Gillotte; music and sound design by Mio Morales
 Unplay Dances, presented by the Solomons Dance Company; choreography by Gus Solomons Jr.; music by Mio Morales
 Steps, environmental dance structure for 12 dancers; choreography by Gus Solomons Jr.; music by Mio Morales and Carl Riley
 Bone Jam, presented by the Solomons Dance Company; choreography by Gus Solomons Jr.; music by Mio Morales
 Nōz, presented by the Solomons Dance Company; choreography by Gus Solomons Jr.; music by Mio Morales
 ''PsychoMotorWorks, presented by the Solomons Dance Company; choreography by Gus Solomons Jr.; music by Mio Morales
 Steps #8, pedal-rock rebus; presented by Solomons Dance Company; choreography by Gus Solomons Jr.; music by Joe Jackson, Police, Steely Dan, arranged by Mio Morales
 Foot/Tongue/Web, conceived, choreographed and performed by Judith Ren-Lay; music by Mio Morales

References

American choreographers
Modern dancers
American male dancers
Male actors from Boston
MIT School of Architecture and Planning alumni
1940 births
Living people
20th-century American dancers
21st-century American dancers